Crispy Park is the seventh album of the Japanese pop rock group Every Little Thing, released on August 9, 2006.

The album's seemingly unconventional name has the meaning of "an enjoyable atmosphere that's both fresh and exciting" (新鮮でワクワクするような楽しい雰囲気), according to ELT's official website.

Track listing

Notes
 co-arranged by Every Little Thing
 co-arranged by Ichiro Ito
 Christmas concert held at the Urakami Cathedral on December 11, 2005.

Charts

External links
 Crispy Park information at Avex Network.
 Crispy Park information at Oricon.

2006 albums
Every Little Thing (band) albums